Liepa is a Latvian and Lithuanian family name. The word literally means "linden tree" in both Latvian and Lithuanian. Its feminine forms in Lithuanian are: Liepienė (married woman or widow) and Liepaitė (unmarried woman). It is also common as feminine given name.

The surname may refer to:
Māris Liepa (1936–1989), Latvian ballet dancer
Andris Liepa (born 1962), Russian ballet star, director and producer
Ingrid Liepa (born 1966), Canadian speed skater
Lasma Liepa (born 1988), Latvian-born Turkish female canoeist
Peter Liepa, Canadian computer programmer

Related surnames: Liepiņš

Lithuanian feminine given names
Latvian-language surnames
Lithuanian-language surnames